Tarzan: Untamed (known as Tarzan: Freeride in Europe and Japan) is a 2001 action-adventure game developed by Ubi Soft Montreal and published by Ubi Soft for the PlayStation 2 and GameCube.

Plot
Picking up quite a while after the defeat of Clayton, Jane and Professor Archimedes Q. Porter now understand Gorilla-language fluently and Jane is married to Tarzan. However, their lives are threatened once again by a brutal band of British explorers led by the unscrupulous Oswald Gardner, who becomes fascinated with Tarzan and strives to capture the ape-man and take him back to England as a media attraction.

Gameplay 
Oswald's henchmen have captured several baby gorillas to sell to zoos. Tarzan must break the cages and return them to the gorilla family. His enemies include poachers and jungle animals, such as leopards, snakes, rhinoceroses, porcupines, wild boars, bats, spiders, piranhas and crocodiles. He also collects film reels that belong to Oswald and spears to use as weapons. In later stages of the game, he receives help from the gorilla family, hippopotamuses and baboons.

Reception

Tarzan: Untamed received mixed reviews upon its release, according to review aggregator Metacritic. GameSpot gave the GameCube version a 6.2 out of 10 while they gave the PlayStation 2 version a 5.9 out of 10. IGN gave the GameCube version a 6.3 out of 10 and said, "Surf tree branches, swing from vines and chuck spears at jungle outsiders -- Tarzan has arrived.", while they gave the PlatStation 2 version a 6.2 out of 10, writing, "The ape man returns with glitz and glamor, but lacks a certain depth. It's a fun but short rental."

References

Ubisoft games
2001 video games
Disney video games
Tarzan video games
Video games set in Africa
Action-adventure games
PlayStation 2 games
GameCube games
Video games based on adaptations
Video games developed in Canada
Single-player video games